Anoplus is a genus of beetle belonging to the family Curculionidae.

The genus was first described by Germar in 1820.

Synonym:
 Nanaplus Gistel, 1856

References

Curculionidae
Curculionidae genera